The Dayton Dragons are a Minor League Baseball team of the Midwest League and the High-A affiliate of the Cincinnati Reds. They are located in Dayton, Ohio, and play their home games at Day Air Ballpark, formerly known as Fifth Third Field. In 2011, they broke the record for most consecutive sellouts by a professional sports team, selling out their 815th consecutive game, breaking the record formerly held by the Portland Trail Blazers.

The Dragons came to Dayton in 2000 as the franchise was relocated from Rockford, Illinois. The franchise was previously known as the Rockford Expos (then Royals, Cubbies, and Reds).  In 2021, the Dragons and 11 other teams that had previously competed in the Midwest League entered the High-A Central as Major League Baseball completed a large restructuring of the minor leagues. This was a temporary name change, with the historical "Midwest League" moniker returning for the 2022 season.

Day Air Ballpark
The team's home park is Day Air Ballpark in Dayton, formerly (until 2020) known as Fifth Third Field. During its first season, the Dragons set a Minor League Baseball Class-A single-season attendance record of 581,853. The Dragons broke that record in 2003 and again in 2004. The Dragons broke the record again in 2010 with a season attendance total of 597,433, which still stands as the Class-A record.

The Dragons have averaged 8,258 fans per game over their 21-year history (through the 2021 season). They have led the Class-A level in attendance in every year of their existence and have finished first among all teams below the Triple-A level for 15 straight seasons from 2006 to 2019 and in 2021 (there was no season in 2020).

On July 9, 2011, the Dragons officially set a new record of 815 consecutive sellout games. The sellout streak is the longest across all professional sports in the US, passing the previous record set by the Portland Trail Blazers from 1977–1995. On May 10, 2014, the streak of consecutive sellouts reached 1,000 games. According to the official team website, every home game in the team's first 20 years (prior to the canceled 2020 season) was a sellout. The streak now stands at 1,385 consecutive sold-out games, an all-time record for sports in North America.

In 2020, the team's stadium was renamed from Fifth Third Field to Day Air Ballpark.

Ownership
In 2014, the founding ownership group, Peter Guber's Mandalay Baseball Properties, sold the team to Palisades Arcadia Baseball LLC, led by Greg Rosenbaum, Nicholas Sakellariadis, and Michael Savit.

Achievements
 The Dragons have led the Midwest League and all of Single A baseball in total season attendance in each of their 18 seasons.
 In 2000, Dragons President Robert Murphy received the Midwest League Executive of the Year Award. He received the award again in 2012.
 In 2004, the Dragons were selected as the winner of the Bob Freitas Award by Baseball America (top Class-A franchise).
 In 2007, the Dragons were selected as one of the "10 Hottest Tickets in Sports" by Sports Illustrated.
 On July 9, 2011, the Dragons set a new record for most consecutive sold-out games (815 total) in all of professional sports. As of the end of the 2018 season, the still-in-progress record stands at 1,316 straight games.
 In 2011, Ballpark Digest named the Dragons the "Minor League Baseball Organization of the Year." This honor came during a year in which they set the all-time professional sports sellout streak of 815 (they finished the season at 843 consecutive sellouts); finished 1st in the Midwest League Eastern Division and had the overall best Midwest League record (.593); set franchise records for wins (83–57), wins in a half (48–22 during the second half, which was also the best record among the 80 teams in the seven full-season Minor League Baseball leagues that split their seasons), road wins (38), and wins in a month (22 in August); set franchise records for team ERA (3.39) and shutout wins (14); set a Midwest League pitching record for strikeouts (1,292); and set a franchise record for stolen bases (224, including 103 by shortstop Billy Hamilton, which was the 9th highest total ever for a Minor Leaguer).
 In 2012, the Dragons were a finalist team for the Sports Business Journal "Professional Sports Team of the Year."
 In 2012, the Dragons franchise was selected as the winner of the John H. Johnson President's Trophy. The winning team, chosen from all minor league teams (Single A, Double A, and Triple A), is chosen by the president of Minor League Baseball and given to "the complete baseball franchise—based on franchise stability, contributions to league stability, contributions to baseball in the community, and promotion of the baseball industry." Only two other Midwest Leagues teams have received this award.
 In 2016, Forbes listed the Dragons as the third-most valuable Minor League Baseball team with a value of $45 million, making them the most valuable Class A minor league franchise.
 In 2016, Dragons Vice President of Sponsor Services Brandy Guinaugh was named the Rawlings Woman Executive of the Year for all of Minor League Baseball
 In 2016, 2017, and 2018, the Dragons have been the Midwest League nominee for Minor League Baseball's Charles K. Murphy Patriot Award for outstanding support of U.S. Armed Forces and Veterans.
 In 2018, the Dragons were selected by Dayton Business Journal as the Miami Valley's Customer Service Business of the Year.
 In 2018, Robert Murphy, Dragons President & General Manager, was selected by Baseball America as the Minor League Baseball Executive of the Year.
 The Dragons have hosted the Midwest League All-Star Game two times, in 2001 and 2013.

Season-by-season records

Major league alumni
Through the 2021 season, 117 Dragons players have gone on to play in Major League Baseball since the team's move to Dayton in 2000. The following are notable players whose minor league career included playing for the Dayton Dragons, including the years they played in Dayton.

Austin Kearns (2000)
Adam Dunn (2000)
Wily Mo Peña (2001)
Edwin Encarnación (2001–02)
Ryan Hanigan (2002–03)
Todd Coffey (2002–03)
Joey Votto (2003–04)
Chris Dickerson (2004)
Homer Bailey (2005)
Johnny Cueto (2006)
Travis Wood (2006)
Adam Rosales (2006)
Jay Bruce (2006)
Drew Stubbs (2007)
Justin Turner (2007)
Chris Heisey (2007)
Zack Cozart (2007–08)
Devin Mesoraco (2008)
Todd Frazier (2007–08)
Didi Gregorius (2010)
Ronald Torreyes (2010–11)
Billy Hamilton (2011)
Tucker Barnhart (2011)
Michael Lorenzen (2013)
Jesse Winker (2013)
Sal Romano (2013–2014)
Amir Garrett (2013–14)
Tyler Mahle (2015)
Aristides Aquino (2015)
Nick Senzel (2015)
Tanner Rainey (2016)
José Siri (2016-17)
Jonathan India (2018)
Noah Davis (2021)

Managers and coaches
The Dragons have had 11 managers in their history:

Freddie Benavides (2000)
Donnie Scott (2001–2003, 2007–2008)
Alonzo Powell (2004–2005)
Billy Gardner, Jr. (2006)
Todd Benzinger (2009–2010)
Delino DeShields (2011–2012)
José Nieves (2013–2015)
Dick Schofield (2016)
Luis Bolivar (2017–19)
José Moreno (2021)
Bryan LaHair (2022-2023)

Additionally, past Dragons coaching staffs have included three inductees into the Cincinnati Reds Hall of Fame as players:
Chris Sabo (2005 Dragons hitting coach)
Ken Griffey, Sr. (2010 Dragons hitting coach)
Tom Browning (2012, 2015 Dragons pitching coach)

Media
Radio: All Dragons home and road games are broadcast on radio on 980 WONE, with Tom Nichols as the lead broadcaster. The broadcasts are also available via the internet at daytondragons.com and wone.com and on mobile devices via the Dragons mobile app. Dragons radio broadcasts moved to WONE starting with the 2011 season after Dragons games aired on WING 1410 AM from 2003-2010 and on WHIO 1290 AM from 2000–2002. Nichols has served as the Dragons Director of Broadcasting and lead play-by-play announcer since the 2008 season. Mike Vander Woude was the team's primary broadcaster from 2000–2007. All home and road games have been broadcast throughout the Dragons history.

Television: The Dragons have televised 25 games per season since the 2011 season with Dragons Director of Broadcasting Tom Nichols serving as the lead announcer. In 2016, telecasts moved to WBDT (Dayton's CW) as games appeared on an over-the-air network station for the first time in Dragons history.  Since the 2016 season, WDTN sports director Jack Pohl has teamed with Nichols on Dragons television broadcasts. From 2001–2010, the Dragons television schedule included 15 games per season before the number of broadcasts was increased to 25 in 2011. The Dragons televised five games in their inaugural season of 2000. Dragons games were televised on WHIO-TV digital channel 7.2 (Time Warner Cable channels 23 and 372) from 2009–2015. Games were televised on Time Warner Cable from 2000–2008. Over the years, Dragons color commentators on television broadcasts have included Joe Nuxhall, Ken Griffey Sr., Tom Browning, Ron Oester, Bill Doran, Tommy Helms, Todd Benzinger, Doug Bair, Jeff Reboulet, and Hal McCoy, among others.

Roster

Player milestones in Dayton Dragons history

 Austin Kearns hit home runs in eight consecutive games from July 17–24, 2000.
 In 2002, Bobby Basham pitched three consecutive nine-inning complete game shutouts for the Dragons. Over 27 innings, he allowed just two walks with 34 strikeouts and surrendered only 11 hits.
 Donald Lutz became the first and only Dragons player to hit for the cycle on July 21, 2011, vs. the Peoria Chiefs. He did it in reverse order within the first five innings of the game (home run, triple, double, single).
 Billy Hamilton became the first player in the history of the Cincinnati Reds organization to compile at least 100 stolen bases in a season when he stole 103 in 2011.
 Seth Mejias-Brean hit an ultimate grand slam home run (game-ending home run with team trailing by three runs) to defeat Beloit on July 18, 2013. Mejias-Brean's walk-off homer came with one out and the bases loaded in the bottom of the 9th, trailing 6–3.
 On May 20, 2017, three Dayton pitchers combined for the first nine-inning no-hitter in Dragons history. Scott Moss, Carlos Machorro, and Brian Hunter combined to no-hit the Bowling Green Hot Rods.
 On July 31, 2017, José Siri extended his hitting streak to 36 consecutive games to break the Midwest League record that had stood since 1977 (Tony Toups, Waterloo, 35). Siri's streak eventually reached 39 straight games.

References

External links

 Official website
 Dayton, Ohio, in the Midwest League
 Dayton Baseball History at Baseball-Reference

Baseball teams established in 1988
Cincinnati Reds minor league affiliates
Chicago Cubs minor league affiliates
Kansas City Royals minor league affiliates
Montreal Expos minor league affiliates
Midwest League teams
Baseball in Dayton, Ohio
Professional baseball teams in Ohio
Tourist attractions in Dayton, Ohio
1988 establishments in Illinois
High-A Central teams